The Pāla Empire (r. 750-1161 CE) was an imperial power during the post-classical period in the Indian subcontinent, which originated in the region of Bengal. It is named after its ruling dynasty, whose rulers bore names ending with the suffix Pāla ("protector" in Prakrit). The empire was founded with the election of Gopāla as the emperor of Gauda in late eighth century AD. The Pala stronghold was located in Bengal and eastern Bihar, which included the major cities of Gauḍa, Vikramapura, Pāṭaliputra, Monghyr, Somapura, Ramavati (Varendra), Tāmralipta and Jaggadala.

The Pālas were astute diplomats and military conquerors. Their army was noted for its vast war elephant corps. Their navy performed both mercantile and defensive roles in the Bay of Bengal. At its zenith under emperors Dharmapala and Devapala in the early ninth century, the Pala empire extended their dominance into the northern Indian region, with its territory stretching across the Gangetic plain to include some parts of western, southern and northeastern India, Nepal and Bangladesh.  Dharmapala also exerted a strong cultural influence through Buddhist scholar Atis Dipankar  in Tibet, as well as in Southeast Asia. Pala control of North India was ultimately ephemeral, as they struggled with the Gurjara-Pratiharas and the Rashtrakutas for the control of Kannauj and were defeated. After a short lived decline, Emperor Mahipala I defended imperial bastions in Bengal and Bihar against South Indian Chola invasions. Emperor Ramapala was the last strong Pala ruler, who gained control of Kamarupa and Kalinga. The empire was considerably weakened with many areas engulfed and their heavy dependence on Samantas being exposed through 11th century rebellion. It finally led to the rise of resurgent Hindu Senas as sovereign power in 12th century and final expulsion of the Palas from Bengal by their hands marking the end of last major Buddhist imperial power in the subcontinent.

The Pala period is considered one of the golden eras of Bengali history. The Palas brought stability and prosperity to Bengal after centuries of civil war between warring divisions. They advanced the achievements of previous Bengali civilisations and created outstanding works of arts and architecture. The Charyapada in Proto-Bengali language was written by Buddhist Mahasiddhas of tantric tradition, which laid the basis of several eastern Indian languages in their rule. Palas built grand temples and monasteries, including the Somapura Mahavihara and Odantapuri, and patronised the great universities of Nalanda and Vikramashila. The empire enjoyed relations with the Srivijaya Empire, the Tibetan Empire and the Arab Abbasid Caliphate. Islam first arrived in Bengal during this period as a result of flourishing mercantile and intellectual contacts with Middle-East. The Pala legacy is still reflected in Tibetan Buddhism.

History

Origins 

According to the Khalimpur copper plate inscription, the first Pala king Gopala was the son of a warrior named Vapyata. The Ramacharitam attests that Varendra (North Bengal) was the fatherland (Janakabhu) of the Palas. The ethnic origins of the dynasty are unknown, although later records claim that Gopala was a Kshatriya or descended from the legendary Solar dynasty. The Ballala-Carita states that the Palas were Kshatriyas, a claim reiterated by Taranatha in his History of Buddhism in India as well as Ghanaram Chakrabarty in his Dharmamangala (both written in the 16th century CE). The Ramacharitam also attests the fifteenth Pala emperor, Ramapala, as a Kshatriya. According to Nitish Sengupta, such claims of belonging to the legendary Solar dynasty seems to be unreliable and appear to be an attempt to cover up the humble origins of the dynasty. The Pala dynasty has also been branded as Śudra in some sources such as Manjushri-Mulakalpa; this might be because of their Buddhist leanings. According to Dr. K. N. Sahay, "we can claim Palas also as Kayasthas".

André Wink mentions that the founder, Gopala was elected, and "definitely not of royal blood but probably of a line of brahmans which transformed itself into kshatriyas". According to Wink, the Palas patronized Buddhism right from the beginning, which is evident from their copper plates. Wink also mentions that Abul Fazl "describes these kings as Kayastha".

Establishment 
After the fall of Shashanka's kingdom, the Bengal region was in a state of anarchy. There was no central authority, and there was constant struggle between petty chieftains. The contemporary writings describe this situation as matsya nyaya ("fish justice" i.e. a situation where the big fish eat the small fish). Gopala ascended the throne as the first Pala king during these times. The Khalimpur copper plate suggests that the prakriti (people) of the region made him the king. Taranatha, writing nearly 800 years later, also writes that he was democratically elected by the people of Bengal. However, his account is in form of a legend, and is considered historically unreliable. The legend mentions that after a period of anarchy, the people elected several kings in succession, all of whom were consumed by the Naga queen of an earlier king on the night following their election. Gopal, however managed to kill the queen and remained on the throne. The historical evidence indicates that Gopala was not elected directly by his citizens, but by a group of feudal chieftains. Such elections were quite common in contemporary societies of the region.

Gopala's ascension was a significant political event as the several independent chiefs recognised his political authority without any struggle.

Imperial expansion and consolidation

Gopala's empire was greatly expanded by his son Dharmapala and his grandson Devapala. Dharmapala was initially defeated by the Pratihara ruler Vatsaraja. Later, the Rashtrakuta king Dhruva defeated both Dharmapala and Vatsaraja. After Dhruva left for the Deccan region, Dharmapala built a mighty empire in the northern India. He defeated Indrayudha of Kannauj, and installed his own nominee Chakrayudha on the throne of Kannauj. Several other smaller states in North India also acknowledged his suzerainty, as far as Jalandhara. Soon, his expansion was checked by Vatsaraja's son Nagabhata II, who conquered Kannauj and drove away Chakrayudha. Nagabhata II then advanced up to Munger and defeated Dharmapala in a pitched battle. Dharmapala was forced to surrender and to seek alliance with the Rashtrakuta emperor Govinda III, who then intervened by invading northern India and defeating Nagabhata II. The Rashtrakuta records show that both Chakrayudha and Dharmapala recognised the Rashtrakuta suzerainty. In practice, Dharmapala gained control over North India after Govinda III left for the Deccan. He adopted the title Paramesvara Paramabhattaraka Maharajadhiraja.

Dharmapala was succeeded by his son Devapala, who is regarded as the most powerful Pala Emperor. His expeditions resulted in the invasion of Pragjyotisha (present-day Assam) where the king submitted without giving a fight and the Utkala (present-day Northern Odisha) whose king fled from his capital city. The inscriptions of his successors also claim several other territorial conquests by him, but these are possibly exaggerated (see the Geography section below).

His oldest son, Rajyapala predeceased him, and as so Mahendrapala, his next older son succeeded him. He possibly maintained his father's vast territories and carried out further campaigns against the Utkalas and the Hunas. He passed his empire intact to his younger brother Shurapala I, who held sway over a considerably large territory encompassing Bengal, Bihar and Uttar Pradesh, proven by his Mirzapur copperplate.
What happened in Gopala II's rule, the son of Surapala I, is still unknown. After Gopala II, Dharmapala's line came to an end for reasons which are not known yet. Dharmapala's descendants, if any, were passed over as Dharmapala's younger brother, Vakapala's lineage assumed the throne.

First period of decline 

Shortly afterwards, the empire gradually started disintegrating. Vakapala's grandson and Jayapala's son, Vigrahapala I abdicated the throne after a brief rule, and became an ascetic. Vigrahapala's son and successor Narayanapala proved to be a weak ruler. During his 54-year long reign, Mihira Bhoja defeated the Palas. Encouraged by the Pala decline, the King Harjara of Assam assumed imperial titles.

Naryanapala's son Rajyapala ruled for at least 32 years, and constructed several public utilities and lofty temples. Earlier it was thought that his son Gopala III lost Bengal after a few years of rule, and then ruled only Bihar. However, it has been debunked by his Bhagalpur inscription, in which he granted a Brahmin two villages in Pundrabardhanabhukti  in Northern Bengal, signaling his control over it. His son and the next king, Vigrahapala II, had to bear the invasions from the Chandelas and the Kalachuris. During his reign, the Pala empire disintegrated into smaller kingdoms like Gauda, Radha, Anga and Vanga. Kantideva of Harikela (eastern and southern Bengal) also assumed the title Maharajadhiraja, and established a separate kingdom, later ruled by the Chandra dynasty. The Gauda state (West and North Bengal) was ruled by the Kamboja Pala dynasty. The rulers of this dynasty also bore names ending in the suffix -pala (e.g. Rajyapala, Narayanapala and Nayapala). However, their origin is uncertain, and the most plausible view is that they originated from a Pala official who usurped a major part of the Pala kingdom along with its capital.

Revival under Mahipala I 

Mahipala I recovered northern and eastern Bengal within three years of ascending the throne in 978 CE.H also recovered his capital, Gauda, which had been lost to he Kambojas. He also recovered the northern part of the present-day Burdwan division. During his reign, Rajendra Chola I of the Chola Empire frequently invaded Bengal from 1021 to 1023 CE to get Ganges water and in the process, succeeded to humble the rulers, acquiring considerable booty. The rulers of Bengal who were defeated by Rajendra Chola were Dharmapal, Ranasur and Govindachandra, who might have been feudatories under Mahipala I of the Pala Dynasty. Rajendra Chola I also defeated Mahipala, and obtained from the Pala king "elephants of rare strength, women and treasure". Mahipala also gained control of north and south Bihar, probably aided by the invasions of Mahmud of Ghazni, which exhausted the strength of other rulers of North India. He may have also conquered Varanasi and surrounding area, as his brothers Sthirapala and Vasantapala undertook construction and repairs of several sacred structures at Varanasi. Later, the Kalachuri king Gangeyadeva annexed Varanasi after defeating the ruler of Anga, which was probably Mahipala's son Nayapala.

Second period of decline 

Nayapala, the son of Mahipala I, defeated the Kalachuri king Karna (son of Ganggeyadeva) after a long struggle. The two later signed a peace treaty at the mediation of the Buddhist scholar Atiśa. During the reign of Nayapala's son Vigrahapala III, Karna once again invaded Bengal but was defeated. The conflict ended with a peace treaty, and Vigrahapala III married Karna's daughter Yauvanasri. Vigrahapala III was later defeated by the invading Chalukya king Vikramaditya VI. Vigrahapala III also faced another invasion led by the Somavamsi king Mahasivagupta Yayati of Orissa. Subsequently, a series of invasions considerably reduced the power of the Palas. The Varmans occupied eastern Bengal during his reign.

The successor and older son of Vighrahapala III by his wife Yauvanashri, Mahipala II's reign is well-documented by Sandhyakar Nandi in Ramacharitam. Mahipala II imprisoned his brothers Ramapala and Surapala II, on the suspicion that they were conspiring against him. Soon afterwards, he faced a rebellion of vassal chiefs from the Kaibarta (fishermen). A chief named Divya (or Divvoka) killed him and occupied the Varendra region. The region remained under the control of his successors Rudak and Bhima. Surapala II escaped to Magadha and died after a short reign. He was succeeded by his brother Ramapala, who launched a major offensive against Divya's nephew Bhima. He was supported by his maternal uncle Mathana and cousin Sivarajadeva of the Rashtrakuta dynasty, as well as several feudatory chiefs of south Bihar and south-west Bengal. Ramapala conclusively defeated Bhima, killing him and his family in a cruel manner.

Revival under Ramapala 

After gaining control of Varendra, Ramapala tried to revive the Pala empire with some success. He ruled from a new capital at Ramavati, which remained the Pala capital until the dynasty's end. He reduced taxation, promoted cultivation and constructed public utilities. He brought Kamarupa and Rar under his control, and forced the Varman king of east Bengal to accept his suzerainty. He also struggled with the Ganga king for control of present-day Orissa; the Gangas managed to annex the region only after his death. Ramapala maintained friendly relations with the Chola king Kulottunga to secure support against the common enemies: the Ganas and the Chalukyas. He kept the Senas in check, but lost Mithila to a Karnataka chief named Nanyuadeva. He also held back the aggressive design of the Gahadavala ruler Govindacharndra through a matrimonial alliance, by marrying off his cousin Kumaradevi to the king.

Final decline 

Ramapala was the final strong Pala Emperor, although his son Kumarapala managed to keep most of his territories. After his death, a rebellion broke out in Kamarupa during his son Kumarapala's reign. The rebellion was crushed by Vaidyadeva, minister of Kumarapala. Vaidyadeva also won a naval war in southern Bengal for his liege. but after Kumarapala's death, Vaidyadeva practically created a separate kingdom. Kumarapala's son, Gopala IV ascended the throne as a child, and according to the Rajibpur copperplate inscription, his uncle Madanpala acted as his regent. Gopala IV either died in battle or was murdered by Madanapala. During Madanapala's rule, the Varmans in east Bengal declared independence, and the Eastern Gangas renewed the conflict in Orissa. Madanapala captured Munger from the Gahadavalas, but was defeated by Vijayasena, who gained control of southern and eastern Bengal. Two rulers, named Govindapala and Palapala ruled over the Gaya district from around 1162 CE to 1200 CE, but there is no concrete evidence about their relationship to the imperial Palas. The Pala dynasty was replaced by the Sena dynasty. The descendants of the Palas, who claimed the status of Kshatriya, "almost imperceptibly merged" with the Kayastha caste.

Geography 

The borders of the Pala Empire kept fluctuating throughout its existence. Though the Palas conquered a vast region in North India at one time, they could not retain it for long due to constant hostility from the Gurjara-Pratiharas, the Rashtrakutas and other less powerful kings.

No records are available about the exact boundaries of original kingdom established by Gopala, but it might have included almost all of the Bengal region. The Pala empire extended substantially under Dharmapala's rule. Apart from Bengal, he directly ruled the present-day Bihar. The kingdom of Kannauj (present-day Uttar Pradesh) was a Pala dependency at times, ruled by his nominee Chakrayudha. While installing his nominee on the Kannauj throne, Dharmapala organised an imperial court. According to the Khalimpur copper plate issued by Dharmapala, this court was attended by the rulers of Bhoja (possibly Vidarbha), Matsya (Jaipur region), Madra (East Punjab), Kuru (Delhi region), Yadu (possibly Mathura, Dwarka or Simhapura in the Punjab), Yavana, Avanti, Gandhara and Kira (Kangra Valley). These kings accepted the installation of Chakrayudha on the Kannauj throne, while "bowing down respectfully with their diadems trembling". This indicates that his position as a sovereign was accepted by most rulers, although this was a loose arrangement unlike the empire of the Mauryas or the Guptas. The other rulers acknowledged the military and political supremacy of Dharmapala, but maintained their own territories. The poet Soddhala of Gujarat calls Dharmapala an Uttarapathasvamin ("Lord of the North") for his suzerainty over North India.

The epigraphic records credit Devapala with extensive conquests in hyperbolic language. The Badal pillar inscription of his successor Narayana Pala states that by the wise counsel and policy of his Brahmin minister Darbhapani, Devapala became the suzerain monarch or Chakravarti of the whole tract of Northern India bounded by the Vindhyas and the Himalayas. It also states that his empire extended up to the two oceans (presumably the Arabian Sea and the Bay of Bengal). It also claims that Devpala defeated Utkala (present-day Northern Odisha), the Hunas, the Kambojas, the Dravidas, the Kamarupa (present-day Assam), and the Gurjaras:
 The Gurjara adversary may have been Mihira Bhoja, who was defeated by Devapala.
 The identity of the Huna king is uncertain.
 The identity of the Kamboja prince is also uncertain. While an ancient country with the name Kamboja was located in what is now Afghanistan, there is no evidence that Devapala's empire extended that far. Kamboja, in this inscription, could refer to the Kamboja tribe that had entered North India (see Kamboja Pala dynasty).
 The Dravida king is usually identified with the Rashtrakuta king Amoghavarsha. Some scholars believe that the Dravida king could have been the Pandya ruler Shri Mara Shri Vallabha, since "Dravida" usually refers to the territory south of the Krishna river. According to this theory, Devapala could have been helped in his southern expedition by the Chandela king Vijaya. In any case, Devapala's gains in the south, if any, were temporary.

Devapala is also believed to have led an army up to the Indus river in Punjab.

His sons and grandson probably managed to keep the core area of the empire intact. However, the empire started disintegrating shortly after. Narayanapala lost control of Assam and Orissa. It was thought he also briefly lost control over Magadha and north Bengal, although it has now been debunked. Gopala III suffered serious reverses at the hands of the Chandra king, and ruled only from a part of northern Bengal. The Pala empire disintegrated into smaller kingdoms during the reign of Vigrahapala II. Mahipala recovered parts of Bengal, Bihar and up to Varansi. His successors lost east and south Bengal again. The last strong Pala ruler, Ramapala, gained control of Bengal, Bihar, Assam and parts of Orissa. By the time of Madanapala's death, the Pala kingdom was confined to parts of central and east Bihar along with northern Bengal.

Administration 

The Pala rule was monarchial. The king was the centre of all power. Pala kings would adopt imperial titles like Parameshwara, Paramvattaraka, Maharajadhiraja. Pala kings appointed Prime Ministers. The Line of Garga served as the Prime Ministers of the Palas for 100 years.
 Garga
 Darvapani (or Darbhapani)
 Someshwar
 Kedarmisra
 Bhatta Guravmisra

Pala Empire was divided into separate Bhuktis (Provinces). Bhuktis were divided into Vishayas (Divisions) and Mandalas (Districts). Smaller units were Khandala, Bhaga, Avritti, Chaturaka, and Pattaka. Administration covered widespread area from the grass root level to the imperial court.

The Pala copperplates mention following administrative posts:

Culture

Religion

Buddhism 
The Palas were patrons of Mahayana Buddhism. A few sources written much after Gopala's death mention him as a Buddhist, but it is not known if this is true. The subsequent Pala kings were definitely Buddhists. Taranatha states that Gopala was a staunch Buddhist, who had built the famous monastery at Odantapuri. Dharmapala made the Buddhist philosopher Haribhadra his spiritual preceptor. He established the Vikramashila monastery and the Somapura Mahavihara. Taranatha also credits him with establishing 50 religious institutions and patronising the Buddhist author Haribhadra. Devapala restored and enlarged the structures at Somapura Mahavihara, which also features several themes from the epics Ramayana and Mahabharata. Mahipala I also ordered construction and repairs of several sacred structures at Saranath, Nalanda and Bodh Gaya. The Mahipala geet ("songs of Mahipala"), a set of folk songs about him, are still popular in the rural areas of Bengal.

The Palas developed the Buddhist centres of learnings, such as the Vikramashila and the Nalanda universities. Nalanda, considered one of the first great universities in recorded history, reached its height under the patronage of the Palas. Noted Buddhist scholars from the Pala period include Atisha, Santaraksita, Saraha, Tilopa, Bimalamitra, Dansheel, Dansree, Jinamitra, Jnanasrimitra, Manjughosh, Muktimitra, Padmanava, Sambhogabajra, Shantarakshit, Silabhadra, Sugatasree and Virachan.

As the rulers of Gautama Buddha's land, the Palas acquired great reputation in the Buddhist world. Balaputradeva, the Sailendra king of Java, sent an ambassador to him, asking for a grant of five villages for the construction of a monastery at Nalanda. The request was granted by Devapala. He appointed the Brahmin Viradeva (of Nagarahara, present-day Jalalabad) as the head of the Nalanda monastery. The Buddhist poet Vajradatta (the author of Lokesvarashataka), was in his court. The Buddhist scholars from the Pala empire travelled from Bengal to other regions to propagate Buddhism. Atisha, for example, preached in Tibet and Sumatra, and is seen as one of the major figures in the spread of 11th-century Mahayana Buddhism.

Shaivism 

The Palas continued to patronize Shaivism, and epigraphic evidence suggests that Mahipala I and Nayapala were initiated as Shaivites by their royal preceptors. Vigrahapala III's Amagachi inscription describes him as "devoted to Śiva worship", and this tradition continued under his successor Ramapala. Poet Sandhyakar Nandi describes Ramapala's son Madanapala as a devotee of Shiva.

The Palas supported the Saiva ascetics, typically the ones associated with the Golagi-Math. Besides the images of the Buddhist deities, the images of Vishnu, Siva and Sarasvati were also constructed during the Pala dynasty rule.

Devapala built a temple dedicated to Shiva's consort, and Mahipala patronized a Shaivite monastery. A 1026 CE inscription recording renovations of Buddhist structures at Sarnath by Pala princes states that Mahipala I had them built "hundreds" of temples of Shiva, Chitraghanta, and other deities in Varanasi.

Narayanapala's Bhagalpur inscription suggests that he built several Shiva temples, and records his grant of a village to Pashupatas. Narayanapala also attended a sacrifice by his Brahmin minister. Nayapala's Siyan inscription suggests that he built several temples dedicated to Shiva and his various aspects (such as Bhairava), plus temples dedicated to the Nine Durgas, the Mother Goddess, Vishnu, and Lakshmi. Despite this, it is unlikely that Nayapala had rejected Buddhist teachings, since Taranatha states that he had a Buddhist preceptor.

Madanapala's queen Chitramatika, gifted land to a brahmana named Vateshvara-svami Sharma as his remuneration for reciting the Mahabharata.

Literature 
The Palas patronised several Sanskrit scholars, some of whom were their officials. The Gauda riti style of composition was developed during the Pala rule. Many Buddhist Tantric works were authored and translated during the Pala rule. Besides the Buddhist scholars mentioned in the Religion section above, Jimutavahana, Sandhyakar Nandi, Madhava-kara, Suresvara and Chakrapani Datta are some of the other notable scholars from the Pala period.

The notable Pala texts on philosophy include Agama Shastra by Gaudapada, Nyaya Kundali by Sridhar Bhatta and Karmanushthan Paddhati by Bhatta Bhavadeva. The texts on medicine include
 Chikitsa Samgraha, Ayurveda Dipika, Bhanumati, Shabda Chandrika and Dravya Gunasangraha by Chakrapani Datta
 Shabda-Pradipa, Vrikkhayurveda and Lohpaddhati by Sureshwara
 Chikitsa Sarsamgraha by Vangasena
 Sushrata by Gadadhara Vaidya
 Dayabhaga, Vyavohara Matrika and Kalaviveka by Jimutavahana

Sandhyakar Nandi's semi-fictional epic Ramacharitam (12th century) is an important source of Pala history.

A form of the proto-Bengali language can be seen in the Charyapadas composed during the Pala rule.

Art and architecture 

The Pala school of sculptural art is recognised as a distinct phase of the Indian art, and is noted for the artistic genius of the Bengal sculptors. It is influenced by the Gupta art.

The Pala style was inherited and continued to develop under the Sena Empire. During this time, the style of sculpture changed from "Post-Gupta" to a distinctive style that was widely influential in other areas and later centuries.  Deity figures became more rigid in posture, very often standing with straight legs close together, and figures were often heavily loaded with jewellery; they very often have multiple arms, a convention allowing them to hold many attributes and display mudras.  The typical form for temple images is a slab with a main figure, rather over half life-size, in very high relief, surrounded by smaller attendant figures, who might have freer tribhanga poses. Critics have found the style tending towards over-elaboration.  The quality of the carving is generally very high, with crisp, precise detail.  In east India, facial features tend to become sharp.

Much larger numbers of smaller bronze groups of similar composition have survived than from previous periods.  Probably the numbers produced were increasing.  These were mostly made for domestic shrines of the well-off, and from monasteries.  Gradually, Hindu figures come to outnumber Buddhist ones, reflecting the terminal decline of Indian Buddhism, even in east India, its last stronghold.

As noted earlier, the Palas built a number of monasteries and other sacred structures. The Somapura Mahavihara in present-day Bangladesh is a World Heritage Site. It is a monastery with a  complex with 177 cells, numerous stupas, temples and a number of other ancillary buildings. The gigantic structures of other Viharas, including Vikramashila, Odantapuri, and Jagaddala are the other masterpieces of the Palas. These mammoth structures were mistaken by the forces of Bakhtiyar Khalji as fortified castles and were demolished. The art of Bihar and Bengal during the Pala and Sena dynasties influenced the art of Nepal, Burma, Sri Lanka and Java.

List of Pala rulers 
Most of the Pala inscriptions mention only the regnal year as the date of issue, without any well-known calendar era. Because of this, the chronology of the Pala kings is hard to determine. Based on their different interpretations of the various epigraphs and historical records, different historians estimate the Pala chronology as follows:

Note:
 Earlier historians believed that Vigrahapala I and Shurapala I were the two names of the same person. Now, it is known that these two were cousins; they either ruled simultaneously (perhaps over different territories) or in rapid succession.
 AM Chowdhury rejects Govindapala and his successor Palapala as the members of the imperial Pala dynasty.
 According to BP Sinha, the Gaya inscription can be read as either the "14th year of Govindapala's reign" or "14th year after Govindapala's reign". Thus, two sets of dates are possible.
 D.K. Ganguly mentions another ruler named Indradumnyapala, who is solely known from local tradition. There is no source of his existence yet. 
 A king, Bhimapala also finds a mention in the Sabdapradipa. Rajat Sanyal argues that if Govindapala and Palapala are indeed accepted as Pala kings, Bhimapala also should be, provided that he was chronologically close to Ramapala according to the wording of the text. However, both need more historical evidence.
 A king named Gomindrapala finds mention in a manuscript, dated his fourth regnal year. R.C. Majumdar identifies him with Govindapala, while S.K. Saraswati suggests he is a later Pala king.

Military 
The highest military officer in the Pala empire was the Mahasenapati (commander-in-chief). The Palas recruited mercenary soldiers from a number of kingdoms, including Malava, Khasa, Huna, Kulika, Mithila, Kanrata, Lata, Odra and Manahali. According to the contemporary accounts, the Rashtrakutas had the best infantry, the Gurjara-Pratiharas had the finest cavalry and the Palas had the largest elephant force. The Arab merchant Sulaiman states that the Palas had an army bigger than those of the Balhara (possibly the Rashtrakutas) and the king of Jurz (possibly the Gurjara-Pratiharas). He also states that the Pala army employed 10,000–15,000 men for fuelling and washing clothes. He further claims that during the battles, the Pala king would lead 50,000 war elephants. Sulaiman's accounts seem to be based on exaggerated reports; Ibn Khaldun mentions the number of elephants as 5,000.

Since Bengal did not have a good native breed of horses, the Palas imported their cavalry horses from the foreigners, including the Kambojas. They also had a navy, used for both mercantile and defence purposes.

See also 

 Middle kingdoms of India
 Nalanda
 Vikramashila
 Somapura Mahavihara
 Jagaddala Mahavihara
 Odantapuri
 Kurkihar hoard

Sources 
The main sources of information about the Pala empire include:

 Pala accounts
 Various epigraphs, coins, sculptures and architecture
 Ramacharita, a Sanskrit work by Abhinanda (9th century)
 Ramacharitam, a Sanskrit epic by Sandhyakar Nandi (12th century)
 Subhasita Ratnakosa, a Sanskrit compilation by Vidyakara (towards the end of the Pala rule)

 Other accounts
 Silsiltut-Tauarikh by the Arab merchant Suleiman (951 CE), who referred to the Pala kingdom as Ruhmi or Rahma
 Dpal dus khyi 'khor lo'i chos bskor gyi byung khungs nyer mkh (History of Buddhism in India) by Taranatha (1608), contains a few traditional legends and hearsays about the Pala rule
 Ain-i-Akbari by Abu'l-Fazl (16th-century)

References

Bibliography 
 
Craven, Roy C., Indian Art: A Concise History, 1987, Thames & Hudson (Praeger in USA),  
 Harle, J. C., The Art and Architecture of the Indian Subcontinent, 2nd edn. 1994, Yale University Press. (Pelican History of Art), 
 
 
 

 
History of Bengal
Former empires in Asia
Kingdoms of Bihar
750 establishments
8th-century establishments in India
12th-century disestablishments in India
Empires and kingdoms of Nepal
8th-century establishments in Nepal
12th-century disestablishments in Nepal
Buddhist dynasties of India